The 1959 Football Championship of UkrSSR were part of the 1959 Soviet republican football competitions in the Soviet Ukraine.

Some 80 teams participated this season and were originally split into 10 groups of eight teams each. The first stage lasted from July 5 to October 4. Winners of all qualification groups formed two semifinal groups which were taking place in Kharkiv and Drohobych on October 17-24. Top two team of semifinal groups proceeded to the final group which was taking place in Kyiv on October 28-31. All final group participants were admitted to the 1960 Ukrainian Class B except for SKVO Odesa, a team of which already competed at team of masters at the level. In addition, eight more teams were admitted to the Class B including six teams from qualification groups.

Following this season, there were established such teams of masters in Ukraine such as FC Mariupol, FC Volyn Lutsk, FC Podillya Khmelnytskyi, FC Avanhard Sumy, FC Desna Chernihiv. 

There also were some clone teams that competed at republican level as well as the All-Union level, among which are Avanhard Mykolaiv, SKVO Odesa, Avanhard Simferopol, Chervona Zirka Kirovohrad.

Teams 
 Debut: Enerhiya Nova Kakhovka, Shakhtar Rutchenkove, Avanhard Simferopol, Spartak Kharkiv, Avanhard Druzhkivka, Khimik Makiivka, Avanhard Dniprodzerzhynsk, Komintern Q/A Kryvyi Rih, KremHESbud, Chervona Zirka Kirovohrad, Avanhard Voznesensk, Avanhard Uman, Avanhard Sumy, Kolhospnyk-2 Poltava, Avanhard Malyn, Avanhard Pryluky, SKVO Odesa, Chervonohvardiyets Odesa, Vodnyk Izmail
 Renamed: Ordzhonikidze Factory Chasiv Yar → Avanhard Chasiv Yar, Avanhard Chernihiv → Chernihiv, Avanhard Mohyliv-Podilskyi → Mohyliv-Podilskyi, Vinnytsia → Avanhard Vinnytsia

Location map

Qualification groups

Group 1

Group 2

Group 3

Group 4

Group 5

Group 6

Group 7

Group 8

Group 9

Group 10

Semifinal groups

Group 1

Group 2

Final

Promoted teams
 Final group (3): Avanhard Zhovti Vody, Torpedo-KhTZ Kharkiv, Naftovyk Drohobych
 Other participants (6): Dynamo Khmelnytskyi (7th in group 8), Avanhard Chernivtsi (3rd in group 9), Khimik Severodonetsk (2nd in group 4), Avanhard Sumy (2nd in group 7), Avanhard Kramatorsk (8th in group 3), Avanhard Zhdanov (2nd in group 1)
 Other teams that did not participate (2): Avanhard Chernihiv, Avanhard Lutsk

Other notes
 FC Shakhtar Rutchenkove (5th in group 2) merged with FC Avanhard Zhdanov
 SKVO Odessa was fielding in tournament its reserve squad having its master team already in Class B competitions

Ukrainian clubs at the All-Union level
The Ukrainian SSR was presented with 28 teams of masters (exhibition teams) at the All-Union level: 

Group A: Dynamo Kyiv, Shakhtar Stalino

Group B: Avanhard Mykolaiv, Metalurh Dnipropetrovsk, Metalurh Zaporizhia, Spartak Kherson, Khimik Dniprodzerzhynsk // Avanhard Kharkiv, Kolhospnyk Cherkasy, Arsenal Kyiv, Zirka Kirovohrad, Avanhard Zhytomyr, Avanhard Kryvyi Rih, Kolhospnyk Poltava // – // Lokomotyv Vinnytsia, SKVO Odesa, Chornomorets Odesa, SKVO Lviv, Spartak Uzhhorod, Kolhospnyk Rivno, SCCF Sevastopol, Avanhard Simferopol, Spartak Stanislav, Avanhard Ternopil // Trudovi Rezervy Luhansk, Lokomotyv Stalino, Shakhtar Kadiivka, Shakhtar Horlivka

See also
 1964 KFK competitions (Ukraine)
 1959 Football Cup of Ukrainian SSR among KFK

References

External links
 1959. Football Championship of the UkrSSR (1959. Первенство УССР.) Luhansk Nash Futbol.
 Group 1: ukr-football.org.ua
 Group 2: ukr-football.org.ua
 Group 3: ukr-football.org.ua
 Group 4: ukr-football.org.ua
 Group 5: ukr-football.org.ua
 Group 6: ukr-football.org.ua
 Final: ukr-football.org.ua

Ukraine
Championship
Football Championship of the Ukrainian SSR